Chryseobacterium oranimense  is a Gram-negative psychrotolerant, proteolytic, lipolytic, rod-shaped and non-motile bacteria from the genus of Chryseobacterium which has been isolated from raw cow milk in Israel.

References

Further reading

External links
Type strain of Chryseobacterium oranimense at BacDive -  the Bacterial Diversity Metadatabase

oranimense
Bacteria described in 2008
Psychrophiles